A Disney adult is an adult who is a devout fan of what is related to Disney. Common hobbies of Disney adults includes visiting Disney theme parks, collecting Disney merchandise, and streaming Disney+.

Buzzfeed News described Disney adults as a "polarizing fandom" that receives scrutiny and ridicule from others.

Origin
Practices associated with the phenomenon, such as Disney weddings, date back decades to the 1990s. Amanda Brennan, senior director of XX Artists, identifies Tumblr as the origin of the Disney adult fandom.

See also
 Dapper Day
 D23-Official Disney fan club
 Disneyland social club
 Disneyana
 Donaldism

References

1990s neologisms
2019 neologisms
Disney fandom
Disney jargon
Internet slang